Eric Horsted is an American television writer. He has written for several shows, including Home Improvement, Coach,  Futurama, Fanboy & Chum Chum, Out of Jimmy's Head and The Simpsons.

Writing credits

Coach episodes 
"About Face"
"Uneasy Riders"
"The Devil in Mrs. Burleigh"
"Something Old, Something New"
"My Best Friend's Girl"
"Jailbirds"
"The Walk-On"
"Kelly's New Guy: Part 1"
"Fool for Lunch"
"Dauber's Vehicle"
"Somebody's Baby"

Fanboy & Chum Chum episodes 
"The Janitor Strikes Back"
"Fanboy Stinks"
"I, Fanbot"
"Chimp Chomp Chumps"
"Precious Pig"
"Monster in the Mist"
"Night Morning"
"Secret Shopper"
"Little Glop of Horrors"
"Refill Madness"
"The Tell-Tale Toy"
"Sigmund the Sorcerer"
"Strings Attached"
"Fanbidextrous"
"Saving Private Chum Chum"
"Jingle Fever"
"The Incredible Chulk"
"The Great Bicycle Mystery"
"A Bopwork Orange"

Futurama episodes 
"I, Roommate"
"A Flight to Remember"
"The Lesser of Two Evils"
"Bender Gets Made"
"War Is the H-Word"
"Bendless Love"
"Bendin' in the Wind"
"A Taste of Freedom"
Bender's Game
"Lethal Inspection"
"The Mutants Are Revolting"
"Yo Leela Leela"
"The Bots and the Bees"
"Near-Death Wish"
"Leela and the Genestalk"
"Stench and Stenchibility"

Reba episodes 
"Someone's at Gyno with Reba"
"Vanny Dearest"

The Simpsons 
"Orange Is the New Yellow"

Disenchantment 
"Swamp and Circumstance"

External links 

Year of birth missing (living people)
Living people
American television writers
American male television writers